Slopné is a municipality and village in Zlín District in the Zlín Region of the Czech Republic. It has about 600 inhabitants.

Notable people
Josef Váňa (born 1952), jockey

Twin towns – sister cities

Slopné is twinned with:
 Slopná, Slovakia

References

External links

Villages in Zlín District